Catocala luscinia is a moth in the family Erebidae first described by Wilhelm Brandt in 1938. It is found in Iran.

References

luscinia
Moths described in 1938
Moths of Asia